Jennifer Grotz (born 1971) is an American poet and translator who teaches English, creative writing, and literary translation at the University of Rochester, where she is Professor of English. In 2017 she was named the seventh director of the Bread Loaf Writers' Conference.

Life
Grotz grew up in small Texas towns but has lived in France and Poland, all of which inform her poems. She holds degrees from Tulane University (BA), Indiana University (MA and MFA), and the University of Houston (PhD). She also studied literature at the University of Paris (Sorbonne).  

Her poems, translations, and reviews have appeared in many literary journals and magazines, and her work has been included in Best American Poetry. She is the first woman to direct the Bread Loaf Writers' Conferences.

She currently lives in Rochester, New York.

Awards

2022: PEN America Award for Poetry in Translation (with Piotr Sommer), for their translation of Everything I Don't Know, Jerzy Ficowski
2017: John Simon Guggenheim Fellowship
2016: National Endowment for the Arts, Literary Translation Fellowship
2013: C.P. Cavafy Poetry Prize, Poetry International
2007: Rona Jaffe Foundation Writers' Award
2007: Camargo Fellowship, Cassis, France
2007: Fellowship from the Vermont Studio Center
2007: New Writing Award from the Fellowship of Southern Writers
2005: Inprint/James Michener Fellowship from the University of Houston
2004: Texas Institute of Arts and Letters: Natalie Ornish Poetry Prize for Best First Book
2004: Individual Artist Grant from the Cultural Arts Council of Houston
2003: American Translators Association, Student Translation Award
2002: Katherine Bakeless Nason Poetry Prize
2002: Prague Summer Program Fellowship in Poetry
2001: Individual Artist Fellowship from the Oregon Arts Commission
1997: Fellowship in Poetry from Literary Arts, Inc.

Works
 Everything I Don't Know, Jerzy Ficowski, translated from the Polish with Piotr Sommer (World Poetry 2021)
 Window Left Open (Graywolf Press, 2016)
 Rochester Knockings, Hubert Haddad, translated from the French (Open Letter, 2015)
 Psalms of All My Days, Patrice de La Tour du Pin, translated from the French (Carnegie Mellon UP, 2013)
 The Needle, poems (Houghton Mifflin Harcourt, 2011)
 Cusp, poems (Houghton Mifflin/Mariner Books, 2003)
 Not Body, limited-edition letterpress poetry chapbook (Urban Editions, 2001)

References

External links
Rona Jaffe Foundation website
Fellowship of Southern Writers
Interview
Author Website: https://www.jennifergrotz.com/

Living people
1971 births
Tulane University alumni
Indiana University alumni
University of Houston alumni
University of Paris alumni
University of Rochester faculty
Warren Wilson College faculty
American women poets
Rona Jaffe Foundation Writers' Award winners
21st-century American poets
American women academics
21st-century American women writers